Richard Teteak (born December 30, 1936) is a former American football player and coach. He was selected by the Green Bay Packers in the 1959 NFL Draft. Teteak served as the head football coach at Beloit College in Beloit, Wisconsin from 1968 to 1970, compiling a record of 3–23.

References

1936 births
Living people
American football guards
Beloit Buccaneers baseball coaches
Beloit Buccaneers football coaches
Wisconsin Badgers football coaches
Wisconsin Badgers football players
People from Oshkosh, Wisconsin
Coaches of American football from Wisconsin
Players of American football from Wisconsin
Baseball coaches from Wisconsin